The 2016 British Superbike Championship season was the 29th British Superbike Championship season. It began at Silverstone on 8 April and ended at the Brands Hatch GP circuit on 16 October. Josh Brookes, and his team Milwaukee Yamaha, were the previous champions but neither defended their titles and instead competed in World Superbikes.

Teams and riders

Race calendar and results

Championship standings

Riders' championship

Manufacturers' championship

References

External links

British Superbike Championship
Superbike Championship
British
British Superbike Championship